Gary Glenn is an American political activist and former member of the Michigan House of Representatives for the state's 98th district, 2015–2018, as a Republican. He has campaigned to prohibit compulsory union membership or financial support as a condition of employment, and as president of the American Family Association of Michigan, he coauthored a 2004 amendment to the state constitution which—with overwhelming voter approval—defined marriage as only between one man and one woman until it was invalidated by the U.S. Supreme Court.

Career

Collective bargaining 
As executive director of the Idaho Freedom to Work Committee from 1980 to 1986, he led a successful effort to enact a state Right to Work law prohibiting collective bargaining agreements that require membership in or financial support of a labor union as a condition of employment. In 2011, he was a founding board member of the Michigan Freedom to Work coalition, which successfully advocated similar legislation in that state. In 2015, the National Right to Work Committee gave him its Senator Everett M. Dirksen Award for advocacy of the Right to Work principle.

Military career 
Glenn enlisted in the U.S. Army Reserves during the Persian Gulf War buildup in 1990 and served eight years in the Reserves and Army National Guard, including with the 1460th Transportation Company headquartered in Midland. He was named "Honor Graduate" of both Basic Combat Training and Advanced Individual Training, earned two Army Reserve Component Achievement Medals, and was honorably discharged at the rank of Sergeant.

American Family Association of Michigan

In 1999 Glenn became president of the American Family Association of Michigan, an organization dedicated to preserving what it maintains are Judeo-Christian values, by opposing civil rights for LGBT people, abortion, and pornography, but which is designated a "hate group" by the Southern Poverty Law Center. The organization campaigned in support of a 2004 referendum to amend the Michigan constitution to define marriage as "the union of one man and one woman"; this measure was overturned by the United States Supreme Court in 2015. Glenn drew controversy in 2015 for remarks he'd made two years earlier for a documentary, that "school officials should be held financially or criminally liable if they tell a student it's OK to be gay and he or she contracts a deadly sexually transmitted disease", a position he defended.

Elective office

2012 U.S. Senate campaign
Glenn ran in the 2012 election for the U.S. Senate, campaigning against marriage and adoption by same-sex couples. He was defeated in the Republican primary by Pete Hoekstra, who would be unsuccessful in challenging Senator Debbie Stabenow.

State legislature 
Glenn was elected to the Michigan House of Representatives in November 2014, representing the 98th House District, comprising the cities of Auburn, Linwood, Midland, and Pinconning, the village of Sanford, and thirteen suburban and rural townships in Bay and Midland counties. In the 2017–2018 legislative term, he served as Associate Speaker of the House Pro Tempore and as chairman of the House Energy Policy Committee. He also served on the House Communications and Technology, Insurance, and Military and Veterans Affairs committees. In the 2015–2016 session, he served as vice chairman of the House Energy Policy Committee and on the House Commerce and Trade, Military and Veterans Affairs, and Tax Policy committees.

Michigan Information and Research Service selected Rep. Glenn from among 55 first-term state representatives and senators as its MIRS "Freshman Legislator of the Year" in 2015, specifically citing his leadership and impact on energy policy and civil asset forfeiture reforms.

Glenn was reelected in 2016 with just over 60 percent of the vote. The Republican House Caucus elected him Associate Speaker of the House Pro Tempore, and he was appointed by the Speaker of the House to serve on the seven-member Committee on Committees, which recommended the chairs and membership of each House committee, and to serve as one of three Finance Co-chairmen of the House Republican Campaign Committee.

Glenn drew attention for his conservative voting record. He received a 100 percent score from Americans for Prosperity–Michigan and from the state chapter of the National Federation of Independent Business. He won the American Conservatives Union's "Award for Conservative Excellence" for the most conservative voting record in the Michigan House in 2015, 2016, and 2017. In 2016, he was named "House Member of the Year" by the Associated Builders and Contractors of Michigan and received NFIB's "Guardian of Small Business" award. In 2017, he was named "House Member of the Year" by the Michigan Propane Gas Association. In 2014 and 2016, the Abolitionist Roundtable, an organization of conservative African-American radio talk show personalities in the metro Detroit area, named him the recipient of its annual "Champion of Liberty Award" for his work towards economically and socially conservative policies. In 2011, he was named "Citizen of the Year" by Citizens for Community Values.

2018 Michigan State Senate campaign 
Gary Glenn and his wife Annette moved from Midland to Bay County's Williams Township, in order to run in the August 2018 primary for the 31st District state Senate seat, comprising Bay, Lapeer, and Tuscola counties. He received 41% of the vote, losing to former state Rep. Kevin Daley with 59%. The state's two regional monopoly utility corporations—Consumers Energy and Detroit Edison—spent an estimated $1.2 million in "dark money" advertising against Glenn, who as chairman of the House Energy Policy Committee had advocated eliminating their monopoly powers and allowing customers to buy electricity from competing energy providers. Glenn's wife, Annette Glenn, succeeded him as representative for the 98th district in the state House.

Personal life 
Gary Glenn is a member of Midland Baptist Church, a life member of the National Rifle Association, and was a founding board member of the new Midland Optimist Club.

He and his wife Annette were married in 1983, and they have five children and nine grandchildren.

Glenn was diagnosed with stage 4 metastatic prostate cancer in January 2016, which showed indications of recurrence in 2018 and 2021.

References

Living people
Year of birth missing (living people)
Republican Party members of the Michigan House of Representatives
21st-century American politicians
Lenoir–Rhyne University alumni